Keith Lawrence may refer to:

 Keith Lawrence (RAF officer) (1919–2016), Royal Air Force officer
 Keith Lawrence (politician) (1891–1978), Democratic politician from Ohio
 Keith Lawrence (rugby), in 1987 Rugby World Cup
 Keith Lawrence (footballer) (born 1954), English football centre back